Urbano Zambotti, C.R. (died 1657) was a Roman Catholic prelate who served as Bishop of Montemarano (1640–1657).

Biography
Urbano Zambotti  was ordained a priest in the Congregation of Clerics Regular of the Divine Providence.
On 21 May 1640, he was appointed during the papacy of Pope Urban VIII as Bishop of Montemarano.
On 28 May 1640, he was consecrated bishop by Alessandro Cesarini (iuniore), Cardinal-Deacon of Sant'Eustachio, with Pietro Antonio Spinelli, Archbishop of Rossano, and Giovanni Battista Altieri, Bishop Emeritus of Camerino, serving as co-consecrators. 
He served as Bishop of Montemarano until his death in 1657.

References

External links and additional sources
 (for Chronology of Bishops) 
 (for Chronology of Bishops)  

17th-century Italian Roman Catholic bishops
Bishops appointed by Pope Urban VIII
1657 deaths
Theatine bishops